Aukra Church is a parish church of the Church of Norway in Aukra Municipality in Møre og Romsdal county, Norway. It is located in the village of Aukrasanden on the southeast coast of the island of Gossa. It is the church for the Aukra parish which is part of the Molde domprosti (arch-deanery) in the Diocese of Møre. The white, wooden church was built in an octagonal design in 1835 by an unknown architect. The church seats about 250 people.

History
There has been a church here on Gossa island for centuries. The earliest existing historical records of the church date back to 1495, but the church was already existing at that time. The first church on the island was probably a stave church that was constructed in the 14th century. In 1648, the old church was rebuilt, saving only the old choir of the stave church. Upon completion, the church was a timber-framed cruciform building. In 1663, the old choir portion of the church was torn down and replaced with new timber-framed construction. In 1709, the church was destroyed by fire after a lightning strike.

In 1712, a new cruciform church was completed on the same site as the old medieval building. On 19 December 1772, the building was also struck by lightning and then burning to the ground. A new cruciform building was constructed on the same site to replace the old building. This time, there was no tower on the church, but rather a free-standing bell tower was constructed to lessen the likelihood of getting struck by lightning again.

In 1814, this church served as an election church. Together with more than 300 other parish churches across Norway, it was a polling station for elections to the 1814 Norwegian Constituent Assembly which wrote the Constitution of Norway. This was Norway's first national elections. Each church parish was a constituency that elected people called "electors" who later met together in each county to elect the representatives for the assembly that was to meet in Eidsvoll later that year.

In 1834, the church was again struck by lightning and it burned to the ground. The new church was built with an octagonal design. It was consecrated in 1835.

See also
List of churches in Møre

References

External links
http://www.aukrakyrkje.no/ 

Aukra
Churches in Møre og Romsdal
Octagonal churches in Norway
Wooden churches in Norway
19th-century Church of Norway church buildings
Churches completed in 1835
14th-century establishments in Norway
Norwegian election church